The Brighton Twins (French: Les jumeaux de Brighton) is a 1908 play by the French writer Tristan Bernard. It is a farce about twins born in Brighton, who are separated at birth and don't meet again for several decades. It is a loose reworking of the classic play Menaechmi by the Roman writer Plautus.

Adaptation
In 1936 the play was adapted into a film The Brighton Twins starring Raimu.

References

Bibliography
 S. Douglas Olson. Ancient Comedy and Reception: Essays in Honor of Jeffrey Henderson. Walter de Gruyter, 2014.

1908 plays
French plays adapted into films
Plays set in England
Plays by Tristan Bernard
Plays based on works by Plautus
Works based on Menaechmi